The Blue Boar is a pub on Castlegate in the city centre of York, in England.

The Blue Boar was a Mediaeval inn on the street.  Among its guests were Roger Cottam, envoy to Henry VII of England, and many Royalist soldiers preparing for the Siege of York.  It was demolished in about 1730 and replaced by the current building, along with the neighbouring 1 and 3 Castlegate.  A tradition states that the body of Dick Turpin was kept in the cellar of the pub overnight, after his execution, and that the landlord of the pub allowed patrons to see the body, for a small fee.  An additional tradition claims that Turpin's ghost haunts the pub.

In 1770, the Robin Hood pub opened on the street, probably as a direct replacement for the Blue Boar, although it is not certain whether it occupied the same building.  It became an important coaching inn, with coaches running daily to Hull and Leeds, and from 1816 also to Selby, along with less regular routes to Richmond, Barnard Castle, Howden and Bubwith.  In Walter Scott's novel, The Heart of Midlothian, the Seven Stars pub is thought to be based on the Robin Hood.

The front of the pub was rebuilt in 1851, including a carriage arch leading to former stables at the rear, and the pub was extended into part of 3 Castlegate.  In about 1894, the pub was again renamed, as the Little John.  It has since been internally rebuilt, and an extension added.  In 1971, it was grade II listed, along with the attached cast iron carriage gates.

In the early-21st century, the pub was owned by Enterprise Inns and described itself as being "gay-friendly".  It closed in 2011, but reopened the following year, returning to the Blue Boar name.

References

Grade II listed pubs in York